Lüliangshan Tunnel is built to allow the Taiyuan–Zhongwei–Yinchuan railway to cross the Lüliang Mountains.

The tunnel is located between Wucheng (a town in Lüliang City) and Fenyang in Shanxi province. It is a dual bores, double track rail tunnel. The left track is 20,785 metres long and the right one is 20,738 metres long. The tunnel construction was started in March 2006, and broken through in October 2009. It was opened to traffic in January 2011.

Location 
 Western portal:

References 

Railway tunnels in China
Rail transport in Shanxi